Typhon was a  (torpilleur d'escadre) built for the French Navy during the 1920s.

After France surrendered to Germany in June 1940 during World War II, Typhon served with the navy of Vichy France.

Design and description
They were powered by two geared steam turbines, each driving one propeller shaft, using steam provided by three du Temple boilers.

The main armament of the Bourrasque-class ships consisted of four Canon de  Modèle 1919 guns in shielded single mounts, one superfiring pair each fore and aft of the superstructure. Their anti-aircraft (AA) armament consisted of a single Canon de  Modèle 1924 gun. The ships carried two triple mounts of  torpedo tubes amidships. A pair of depth charge chutes were built into their stern that housed a total of sixteen  depth charges.

Construction and career
She was at Oran, French Algeria, as part of the 7th Destroyer Squadron of the Marine Nationale when the Allies invaded French North Africa in Operation Torch in November 1942. On 8 November 1942, Typhon engaged the British cutter HMS Hartland from very short distance, sinking her in the harbour in a matter of minutes, when the Allied vessel was in the process of landing American troops. Later in the morning, Typhon and her sister ships Tramontane and Tornade steamed away in an attempt to attack Allied naval forces at Arzew Bay. The destroyer squadron was met with heavy fire by the British cruiser HMS Aurora. Typhon launched all her six torpedoes at the cruiser to no avail; her sisters were repeatedly hit by 6in shells. Tramontane was sunk and Tornade ran aground, while Typhoon returned to port with half her ammunition expended and without torpedoes, all of them launched at Aurora to no avail. Tramontane's survivors were also aboard. Typhon confronted the Allies once again on 9 November, this time with her sister Epervier. The destroyer attack was beaten off by the British cruisers Jamaica and Aurora; Epervier was hit and beached herself, while Typhon sailed back to Oran, where she was eventually scuttled by her own crew on 10 November 1942.

Notes

References

 
 

Bourrasque-class destroyers
World War II destroyers of France
Ships built in France
1925 ships
Maritime incidents in November 1942
Scuttled vessels